This is the list of the 91 Members of the Canadian Parliament that lost their seat at the 2011 Canadian federal election.

The leader of the Liberal Party Michael Ignatieff lost his riding of Etobicoke—Lakeshore to Bernard Trottier, a Conservative, and the following day he announced he would resign as Liberal leader. Gilles Duceppe, leader of the Bloc Québécois and incumbent in Laurier—Sainte-Marie was defeated by Hélène Laverdière of the NDP and announced his intention to resign as leader of the Bloc.

Four Cabinet ministers, Lawrence Cannon (Foreign Affairs), Gary Lunn (Sport), Jean-Pierre Blackburn (Veterans Affairs and Agriculture), and Josée Verner (Intergovernmental Affairs and Francophonie) lost their seats. Lunn lost to Green Party leader Elizabeth May, and the New Democratic Party won the other three seats.

List of MPs 

Sukh Dhaliwal – The two-term Liberal MP lost his Newton—North Delta seat to New Democratic Party candidate, Jinny Sims. Dhaliwal regained his seat when it was redistricted into the Surrey—Newton riding at the 2015 election
Gary Lunn- The Conservative Minister of Sport lost his Saanich—Gulf Islands seat to the leader of the Green Party of Canada, Elizabeth May. May became the first ever Green MP in to be elected to the House of Commons of Canada.
Dona Cadman – The one-term Conservative MP lost her seat in Surrey North to New Democrat candidate Jasbir Sandhu. Along with Josée Verner and Sylvie Boucher, Cadman was one of the three female Conservative MPs to be unseated in this election.
Brian Murphy

Table

References 

2011 Canadian federal election
Lists of Canadian MPs who were defeated by election